The Archdiocese of Kinshasa (Latin: Archidioecesis Kinshasana; French: Archidiocèse de Kinshasa) is an archdiocese of the Roman Catholic Church in the Democratic Republic of the Congo. Its ecclesiastic territory includes the capital city of Kinshasa and surrounding districts. The archdiocese is the metropolitan see for the Ecclesiastical Province of Kinshasa. The current archbishop is Fridolin Ambongo Besungu.

Established as the Apostolic Vicariate of the Belgian Congo by Pope Leo XIII in 1888, it was raised to the status of an archdiocese in 1959. In 1966, its name was changed from the Archdiocese of Léopoldville to the Archdiocese of Kinshasa. Today, the archdiocese covers a territory of 8,500 km2 (3,283 sq mi) and, as of 2016, has a total population of 11,323,000, of whom 6,378,000 (56.3%) are Catholic. The archdiocese is served by 1,208 priests, including 238 diocesan priests and 970 religious priests, 1,661 male religious (including religious priests and brothers), and 1,982 religious sisters. The archdiocese has 143 parishes, including the Cathedral of Our Lady of the Congo in Kinshasa.

History 
The archdiocese was established on 22 November 1886 as the Mission sui iuris of the Belgian Congo, from territory taken from both the Apostolic Prefecture of Lower Congo (in Cubango, Angola) and the Apostolic Vicariate of Two Guineas (in Gabon). It was promoted on 11 May 1888 as the Apostolic Vicariate of Belgian Congo. Over time, it lost territory repeatedly: to establish the Mission sui juris of Kwango on 18 April 1892,  the Apostolic Prefecture of Uélé on 12 May 1898, the Mission sui juris of Kasaï Supérieur on 26 July 1901, the Apostolic Prefecture of Stanley Falls on 3 August 1904, the Apostolic Prefecture of Ubangui Belge on 7 April 1911, and the Apostolic Prefecture of Matadi and the Apostolic Prefecture of Northern Katanga on 1 July 1911.

On 3 April 1919, it was renamed the Apostolic Vicariate of Léopoldville. It lost territory several times more: to establish the Mission sui juris of Bikoro on 3 January 1931, the Apostolic Vicariate of Boma on 26 February 1934, the Apostolic Prefecture of Kole on 14 June 1951, and the Apostolic Vicariate of Inongo on 29 June 1953. It was elevated on 10 November 1959 as the Archdiocese of Léopoldville, when the city was soon to become the national capital of the newly independent Republic of the Congo. It was renamed the Archdiocese of Kinshasa on 30 May 1966, when the city's name was changed from Léopoldville to Kinshasa. The archdiocese was visited by Pope John Paul II in May 1980 and again in August 1985.

Bishops

Ordinaries

Apostolic Vicars of the Belgian Congo
François Camille Van Ronslé, C.I.C.M. (1896-1919); see below

Apostolic Vicars of Léopoldville
François Camille Van Ronslé, C.I.C.M. (1919-1926); see above
Natale de Cleene, C.I.C.M. (1926-1932)
Georges Six, C.I.C.M. (1934-1952)
Félix Scalais, C.I.C.M. (1953-1959); see below

Archbishops of Léopoldville
Félix Scalais, C.I.C.M. (1959-1964); see above
Joseph Malula (1964-1966); future Cardinal; see below

Archbishops of Kinshasa
Joseph Malula (1966-1989) (Cardinal in 1969); see above
Frédéric Etsou-Nzabi-Bamungwabi, C.I.C.M. (1990-2007) (Cardinal in 1991)
Laurent Monsengwo Pasinya (2007-2018) (Cardinal in 2010)
Fridolin Ambongo Besungu, O.F.M. Cap. (2018–present) (Cardinal in 2019)

Coadjutor bishops
Noël de Cleene, C.I.C.M. (1924-1926), as Coadjutor vicar apostolic
Fridolin Ambongo Besungu, O.F.M. Cap. (2018); future Cardinal

Auxiliary Bishops of Kinshasa
Joseph Malula (1959-1964), appointed Archbishop here; future Cardinal
Eugène Moke Motsüri (1970-1991)
Tharcisse Tshibangu Tshishiku (1970-1991), appointed Bishop of Mbujimayi
Dominique Bulamatari (1999-2009), appointed Bishop of Molegbe
Edouard Kisonga Ndinga, S.S.S. (1999–present)
Daniel Nlandu Mayi (1999-2008), appointed Coadjutor Bishop of Matadi
Timothée Bodika Mansiyai, P.S.S. (2012-2016), appointed Bishop of Kikwit
Sébastien-Joseph Muyengo Mulombe (2012-2013), appointed Bishop of Uvira 
Donatien Bafuidinsoni Maloko-Mana, S.J. (2015-2018), appointed Bishop of Inongo
 Jean-Pierre Kwambamba Masi (2015-2018), appointed Bishop of Kenge
 Jean-Crispin Kimbeni Ki Kanda (2020-), elect
 Charles Ndaka Salabisala (2020-), elect
 Vincent Tshomba Shamba Kotsho (2020-), elect

Suffragan dioceses 
The Archdiocese of Kinshasa is the metropolitan archdiocese of the Ecclesiastical Province of Kinshasa, which includes the following suffragan dioceses:

 Boma
 Idiofa
 Inongo
 Kenge
 Kikwit
 Kisantu
 Matadi
 Popokabaka

See also 
 Catholic Church in the Democratic Republic of the Congo
List of Catholic dioceses in the Democratic Republic of the Congo

References

Source and External links 
 GCatholic.org, with incumbent biography links

Kinshasa
Kinshasa
Religious organizations established in 1886
Kinshasa
1886 establishments in the Congo Free State